This is a list of notable people of the  Sengunthar or Kaikkolar caste found in the Indian state of Tamil Nadu and in Sri Lanka.

Chieftains
Veerabaahu: commander-in-chief of Murugan's army.
Chandramathi Mudaliar: was a 17th-century Tamil chieftain and ruler of south Kongu Nadu (Erode region) who fought many battles against the Telugu Madurai Nayak. Erode Fort was built by him.

Freedom fighters

Tirupur Kumaran: Freedom fighter  from Chennimalai who lost his life for saving Indian national flag. He founded Desa Bandhu Youth Association and led protests against the British. His birth name was OKSR. Kumarasamy Mudaliar.
Thillaiaadi Valliammai, was a South African Tamil woman who worked with Mahatma Gandhi in her early years when she developed her nonviolent methods in South Africa fighting its apartheid regime and sacrificed her life in prison.

Business 

A. Kulandaivel Mudaliar, Founder of The Chennai Silks, Sri Kumaran Thanamaligai and SCM Group. Hailed from Pattaliyar Gothram.

S. Muthusamy Mudaliar: was a Textile merchant and businessman from Erode district. Along with his father he was the founder of the Nilgiris Supermarket in 1905. It is also one of the oldest supermarket chains in India with origins dating back to 1905.

Philanthropy
Raja Sir Savalai Ramaswami Mudaliar, an INC leader, merchant, dubash, politician and philanthropist known for starting Choultry near Chennai Central and philanthropic activities in Cuddalore .
Rao Bahadur M. Jambulingam Mudaliar, Philanthropist from cuddalore who was donator of 620 acres land to Neyveli lignite corporation.

Social workers
Nachimuthu Mudaliar, a philanthropist from Chennimalai. He was the founder of Chentex weavers co-operative society in which thousands of weavers benefited and he was a Padma Shree awardee. He was former president of Senguntha Mahajana Sangam.
J. Sudhanandhen Mudaliyar:Was an Indian philanthropist, educationalist, and textile merchant. He founded of Erode Sengunthar Engineering College and M.P.Nachimuthu M.Jaganathan Engineering College in Erode district of Tamil Nadu state. He was hailed from Senguntha Kaikolar.
Padma Sri P. K. Gopal: is an Indian social worker and a co-founder of International Association for Integration, Dignity and Economic Advancement.

Entrepreneurs
Padma Sri Pappammal: is an organic farmer from Tamil Nadu, India. At the age of 105, she is argued to be the oldest farmer still active in the field.

Literature

Ottakoothar 12th century court poet and minister of Cholas known Kavichakravarthy.
Irattaipulavar (Mudhusooriyar, Ilam sooriyar) 14th century poetical-duo (one blind and one lame) who authored Ekambaranathar ula.
Kangeyar, a 14th-century poet who wrote "Urichol Nigandu".
Padikasu Pulavar Tamil poet of 17th century known for his work 'Thondaimandala Sadhakam'.

Bharathidhasan (1891-1964) (born as Kanaga. SubbuRathinam Mudaliar) known as Paavendhar, Puratchi Kavignar ,  Tamil poet, politician, social activist and teacher.
Tamilanban (b.1933): Tamil Poet and writer.

Civil Service 
T. V. Rajeswar IPS: former Intelligence Bureau chief and a Governor of 4 states.

Politics
 CP Subbiah Mudaliar: Former INC Leader from Coimbatore

 C. N. Annadurai: Former Chief Minister of Tamil Nadu and founder of the DMK party
Pulavar K. Govindan: 4 times elected as MLA. Two times elected as speaker of Tamil Nadu legislative Assembly.
C. Gopal Mudaliyar: ADMK politician, Former Sholinghur MLA and a former Arakkonam MP.
M. R. Kandasamy Mudaliar: is an Indian politician, Textile merchant and former Member of the Legislative Assembly of Tamil Nadu from Veerapandi constituency as an Indian National Congress candidate in 1957 election. He was born in Sengunthar Kaikola Mudaliyar family in Salem district.
A. Mariappan Mudaliar: is an Indian politician,  Philanthropist and was ex MLA of Salem - I constituency. Mariappa Mudaliar was president of the Ammapettai Handloom Weavers'Cooperative Society from 1952 to 1971. This cooperative society is oldest and biggest in Tamil Nadu. This cooperative Society improved the economy of thousands of weavers.
E. S. Thyagarajan Mudaliar: Prominent leader of DMK and he was former MLA of Tiruttani constituency. Uncle of Dr. E.S.S. Raman.
Dr. E.S.S. Raman: State Vice President Tamil Maanila Congress and was former MLA of Pallipattu constituency. 
B. Senguttuvan: Prominent lawyer from Vellore and former Member of Parliament.
M. Sundaram, Former INC Politician and served as Rishivandhiyam MLA.
S. Sivaraj, Former INC Politician and served as Rishivandhiyam MLA.
S. Murugaiyan, Former DMK MP and MLA.
Cheyyar Devaraj ex MLA for Cheyyar.
V. Somasundaram Former ADMK Handloom Minister and former Uthiramerur MLA.
V.Saminathan BJP leader of Puducherry state ex-MLA and current BJP state president of Puducherry.

Arts and Cinema
T. R. Sundaram Mudaliyar Yesteryears Film producer and Founder of Modern Theatres Ltd. Hailed from Pullikkarar Gothram.
A. Jagannathan, Yesteryears Tamil film director
P. S. Veerappa, Yesteryears Tamil film producer and actor.
R.K. Selvamani, President, Film Employees Federation of South India (FEFSI) and film director.
Na. Muthukumar: Late Tamil poet, movie script writer and lyricist.
Anandaraj: Tamil film actor.
Pa. Vijay: Tamil poet, film actor and lyricist
Lokesh Kanagaraj: Blockbuster Tamil Film Director.

Science
Mylsamy Annadurai, former ISRO scientist and former director, ISRO Satellite Centre (ISAC), Bengaluru.
M. Annamalai, Space scientist and former director of the Satish Dhawan Space Centre, Sriharikota and Senior Advisor for Space Transportations Systems at ISRO.

Spiritual
Dandi Adigal Nayanar: is the 31st Nayanar saint. Traditional hagiographies like Periya Puranam (13th century CE) and Thiruthondar Thogai (10th century CE) describe him as a great devotee of the Hindu god Shiva.
Kanampulla Nayanar: is the 46th Nayanar saint. Traditional hagiographies such as the Periya Puranam (13th century CE) and Thiruthondar Thogai (10th century CE) describe him as a great devotee of the Hindu god Shiva.

Kirupanandha Variyar: was a Shaivite spiritual teacher from India. He was an ardent Murugan devotee who helped rebuild and complete the works on many of the temples across the state. People believes him as 64th Nayanar saint.

References

Tamil society
Sengunthar